The 2021–22 Ferencvárosi TC season is the club's 123rd season in existence and the 13th consecutive season in the top flight of Hungarian football. In addition to the domestic league, Ferencváros are participating in this season's editions of the Hungarian Cup and the UEFA Europa League. The season covers the period from July 30, 2021, to 14 May 2022.

Squad

Transfers

Summer

In:

Out:

Source:

Winter

In:

Out:

Source:

Pre–season and friendlies

Competitions

Overview

Nemzeti Bajnokság I

League table

Results summary

Results by round

Matches

Hungarian Cup

UEFA Champions League

First qualifying round

Second qualifying round

Third qualifying round

Play-off round

UEFA Europa League

Group stage

Appearances and goals
Last updated on 15 May 2022.

|-
|colspan="14"|Youth players:

|-
|colspan="14"|Out to loan:

|-
|colspan="14"|Players no longer at the club:

|}

Top scorers
Includes all competitive matches. The list is sorted by shirt number when total goals are equal.
Last updated on 15 May 2022

Disciplinary record
Includes all competitive matches. Players with 1 card or more included only.

Last updated on 15 May 2022

Clean sheets
Last updated on 15 May 2022

Notes

Ferencváros II

Nemzeti Bajnokság III

Central group

Results summary

Results by round

Matches

References

External links

Ferencvárosi TC seasons
Ferencvárosi TC
Ferencvárosi TC
Ferencvárosi TC